Freeman Hollow is a valley in Oregon County in the U.S. state of Missouri.

Freeman Hollow has the name of Peter Freeman, a pioneer citizen.

References

Valleys of Oregon County, Missouri
Valleys of Missouri